Guilty Men is a short book published in Great Britain in July 1940 that attacked British public figures for their failure to re-arm and their appeasement of Nazi Germany in the 1930s. A classic denunciation of the former government policy, it shaped popular and scholarly thinking for two decades.

Contents
Guilty Men was a British polemical book written under the pseudonym "Cato" published in July 1940. It attacked fifteen public figures for their failed policies towards Germany and for their failure to re-equip the British armed forces. In denouncing appeasement, it defines the policy as the "deliberate surrender of small nations in the face of Hitler's blatant bullying".

The book's slogan, "Let the guilty men retire", was an attack on members of the National Government before Winston Churchill became Prime Minister in May 1940. Most were Conservatives, although some were National Liberals and one was Ramsay MacDonald, the former leader of the Labour Party. Several were current members of Churchill's government. The book shaped popular thinking about appeasement for twenty years; it effectively destroyed the reputation of former Prime Ministers Stanley Baldwin and Neville Chamberlain, and contributed to the defeat of the Conservative Party at the 1945 general election. According to historian David Dutton, "its impact upon Chamberlain's reputation, both among the general public and within the academic world, was profound indeed".

The "guilty men" were:

Neville Chamberlain
Sir John Simon
Sir Samuel Hoare
Ramsay MacDonald
Stanley Baldwin
Lord Halifax
Sir Kingsley Wood
Ernest Brown
David Margesson
Sir Horace Wilson
Sir Thomas Inskip
Leslie Burgin
Earl Stanhope
W. S. Morrison
Sir Reginald Dorman-Smith

Though mostly devoted to the uncanny blindness and inertia of the Conservative majority that in 1939 led a criminally underprepared Britain into a fateful war, followed by the disastrous losses of Norway and of France in 1940, the authors look briefly at the Army's contribution to the French collapse. While praising the discipline and courage of the soldiers in the field, they point to grave errors of strategy. Some lessons that should have been obvious from the 1914-1918 war over the same terrain were ignored: you need a secure perimeter to fall back on; you need a mobile reserve to call on; in defence, you must guard against infiltration by motorised infantry; in defence, you need copious anti-aircraft and anti-tank artillery; to attack, you need superiority in aircraft and tanks.

Authorship
Guilty Men was written by three journalists: Michael Foot (a future leader of the Labour Party), Frank Owen (a former Liberal MP), and Peter Howard (a Conservative). They believed that Britain had suffered a succession of bad leaders who, with junior ministers, advisers and officials, had conducted a disastrous foreign policy towards Germany and had failed to prepare the country for war. After Victor Gollancz, creator of the Left Book Club, had been persuaded to publish the book, the authors divided the 24 chapters among themselves and wrote it in four days, finishing on 5 June 1940. Gollancz asked for some of the rhetoric to be toned down, fearing the reaction it might provoke, but he rushed it into print in four weeks.

It was under a pseudonym because the writers were employed by Lord Beaverbrook, who barred his journalists from writing for publications other than his own. Beaverbrook, who was active in the Conservative Party, was also a vocal supporter of appeasement, though he was not mentioned in the book.

There was much speculation as to who Cato was. At one time Aneurin Bevan was named as its author. In the meantime, the real authors had some fun reviewing their own work. Michael Foot wrote an article, "Who is This Cato?" Beaverbrook was as much in the dark as anyone but joked that he "made do with the royalties from Guilty Men". The authors earned no money from the book as their literary agent, Ralph Pinker, absconded with the royalties.

Publication
Guilty Men was published in early July 1940, shortly after Churchill became Prime Minister, the Dunkirk evacuation had shown Britain's military unpreparedness, and the Fall of France left the country with few allies. Several major book wholesalers, W H Smith and Wyman's, and the largest book distributor, Simpkin Marshall, refused to handle the book. It was sold on news-stands and street barrows and went through twelve editions in July 1940, selling 200,000 copies in a few weeks.

Guilty Men remains in circulation and was reprinted for its historical interest by Penguin Books to mark its sixtieth anniversary in 2000.

Evaluation
The speed with which Guilty Men was written shows in its errors. For example, the authors muddled the place and date where Baldwin said that re-armament was unpopular with the voters. They placed it at the 1933 Fulham East by-election, instead of the 1935 general election, and dated the by-election to 1935. ("1935" was corrected to "1933" in later editions, but the 1998 Penguin facsimile edition reproduced the error without comment.) It also shows in its detailed description of the recent evacuation of the British Expeditionary Force from Dunkirk.

The book's arguments and conclusions have been questioned by politicians and historians. In 1945, Quintin Hogg, MP, wrote The Left was never Right, which was critical of Guilty Men and argued that "unpreparedness before the war was largely the consequence of the policies of the parties of the Left". In 1944, Geoffrey Mander had published We were not all wrong.

The idea of appeasement as error and cowardice was challenged by historian A. J. P. Taylor in his book The Origins of the Second World War (1960), in which he argued that, in the circumstances, it might be seen as a rational policy.

See also
 The Left Was Never Right, a Tory contrary view by Quintin Hogg 
 The bomber will always get through, a military/political belief from the 1930s that held that in future conflicts regardless of air defences sufficient numbers of bombers would survive to destroy cities and infrastructure

Notes

Citations

Bibliography

Further reading
 Aster, S. "'Guilty men': the case of Neville Chamberlain" in R. Boyce and E. Robertson, eds., Paths to war: new essays on the origins of the Second World War (1989)
 Dutton, D. J. "Guilty men (act. 1940)", Oxford Dictionary of National Biography, Oxford University Press. online
 Faber, David. Munich, 1938: Appeasement and World War II (2009).
 Hucker, Daniel. "The Unending Debate: Appeasement, Chamberlain and the Origins of the Second World War." Intelligence and National Security 23.4 (2008): 536-551.
 Morgan, Kenneth O. Michael Foot: A Life (2007), ch 3

Books about politics of the United Kingdom
Michael Foot
Books about World War II
1940 non-fiction books
1940 in British politics
1940 in the United Kingdom
Anti-fascist books